USCGC Munro (WMSL-755) is the sixth  of the United States Coast Guard. Munro is the second cutter named for Signalman First Class Douglas A. Munro (1919–1942), the only Coast Guardsman to be awarded the Medal of Honor. The US Navy destroyer escort  was also named for Munro.

History

Huntington Ingalls Industries subsidiary Ingalls Shipyard in Pascagoula, Mississippi, was awarded the $487.1 million construction contract on April 30, 2013. Construction officially began on October 7, 2013 with a ceremony marking the cutting of the first 100 tons of steel. Munro was launched at Pascagoula on September 12, 2015 and christened there on November 14, 2015.

On June 18, 2019, the crew participated in capturing a narco-submarine carrying 17,000 pounds of cocaine. The total amount of drugs seized was valued at $232 million USD, representing one of the largest drug seizures to date. Video of the incident was later made available on both news and military websites. The video shows the Coast Guard ordering the submarine to stop, followed by Coast Guard personnel jumping aboard the still moving submarine and forcing the hatch open, leading to the surrender of the submarine's crew.

See also
 National Security Cutter
 Coast Guard: 
 Navy: 
 Integrated Deepwater System Program

References

External links

 USCGC Munro (WMSL 755), U.S. Coast Guard Pacific Area

Legend-class cutters
Ships of the United States Coast Guard
2016 ships
Ships built in Pascagoula, Mississippi